The 2003 Nice bombing was a double bomb attack in the city of Nice, France on 20 July 2003. Sixteen people were injured in the blasts against the regional directorates of customs and the treasury. The Corsican separatist National Liberation Front of Corsica (FLNC) claimed responsibility, and was one of the biggest bombs exploded by the group on the French mainland.

The attack came one week after the FLNC ended its seven-month ceasefire amid French government rejections about autonomy for Corsica. Tensions on the island had also increased following the arrest of militant member Yvan Colonna in June and the Corsican autonomy referendum on 6 July.

The FLNC also committed some other, albeit minor, attacks in Nice that year, including a bomb attack at a French military facility on 10 October.

References

2003 crimes in France
2003 bombing
Attacks on buildings and structures in 2003
Attacks on buildings and structures in France
Attacks on government buildings and structures
2003 bombing
Improvised explosive device bombings in 2003
Improvised explosive device bombings in France
July 2003 crimes
July 2003 events in France
Terrorist incidents in France in 2003
Terrorist incidents in Provence-Alpes-Cote d'Azur
Building bombings in France